The 1986 British Speedway Championship was the 26th edition of the British Speedway Championship. The Final took place on 1 June at Brandon in Coventry, England. The Championship was won by Neil Evitts, with Phil Collins in second place and Jeremy Doncaster winning a run-off for third.

Final 
1 June 1986
 Brandon Stadium, Coventry

See also 
 British Speedway Championship
 1986 Individual Speedway World Championship

References 

British Speedway Championship
Great Britain